Premam is the soundtrack album for the 2015 Malayalam-Tamil film of the same name directed by Alphonse Puthren and starring Nivin Pauly and Sai Pallavi. The original soundtrack and background score were composed by Rajesh Murugesan, who had collaborated with Puthren in the film Neram (2013). Shabareesh Varma, beside singing, wrote the lyrics for eight of the nine songs. One song "Rockaankuthu" which had lyrics written by Pradeep Palarr was sung by Tamil film composer Anirudh Ravichander. The soundtrack album was released by the record label Muzik 247 on 14 February 2015 and topped the charts, with songs "Aaluva Puzha" and "Malare" became instant hits. The album was listed as the Best Malayalam Music Album of the year by Apple Music.

Development 
Puthren roped in Rajesh Murugesan as the film's composer in April 2014, following the success of Neram. Unlike many films during the Malayalam new generation have less than five tracks in the album, Puthren insisted that Rajesh compose at least 13–14 tracks for the film, since the narrative of the film is musical and Puthren believed that the songs would have great impact on the film. However, the final track list only had 9 songs. Shabareesh Varma initially wrote one song for the director–composer collaboration's previous film, which was "Pistah". As the track became viral upon release, Puthren roped him as the norm lyricist and asked him to pen eight tracks for the film. Shabareesh started penning the first song, a "gibberish" track for the film in May 2014. Most of his tracks were written at his house in Aluva, where Rajesh and Puthren were present.

Shabareesh commented that some of his film songs seemed to come true in real life. In an interview with Deccan Chronicle, he stated that when he wrote the song "Ithu Puthan Kaalam", he got much money to solve his financial troubles. However, when he wrote the second song "Kaalam Kettupoi", the recording studio due to heavy rains and lightning, but the laptop with the film's songs was safe with the music director Rajesh Murugesan. The track "Scene Contra" was written as the eponymous title song for a short film, and was written within eight minutes. As some of his friends demanded that the song should be used in a film album instead of a short film. Then, Puthren suggested that the song could be used in Premam and Rajesh wrote background orchestration for this purpose.

In September 2014, actor Murali Gopy recorded the song "Kalippu" during the time he worked on singing two songs simultaneously. Similar to "Scene Contra", this song was also recorded for a short film under the title "Kalippu", but following Puthren's suggestions, this song was used in the film. In addition to Shabareesh Varma, screenwriter-cum-lyricist Pradeep Palarr also penned one song titled "Rockaankuthu" recorded by Tamil film composer Anirudh Ravichander.

Marketing 
The music album of Premam was launched on 14 February 2015 on the occasion of Valentine's Day through streaming media for digital download. Followed by the digital release, the audio CDs were released through music stores on 28 February, with a record number of CDs sold on the first day of its release. All the audio songs released prior to the film release went viral on the internet. In March 2015, video for the song "Aluva Puzha" sung by Vineeth Sreenivasan was released and became the chart topper. As a marketing strategy the song "Scene Contra" was released later on 5 May and "Malare" was released on YouTube on 6 June. The song received 1 million hits within 14 hours of release and trended on all social networking platforms.

Reception 
Writing for The New Indian Express, music critic Vipin Nair noted, "The Neram team's (Alphonse Puthren-Rajesh Murugesan-Shabareesh Varma) sophomore effort in Premam is almost as impressive, but for an occasional let down by the vocal choices". Behindwoods in their first music review in Malayalam gave the album 3.75 out of 5 stars and stated "Fall in love with this wholesome gem!" Karthik Srinivasan of Milliblog called the soundtrack in "as middling at its best", although the song "Malare" received praise. Indiaglitz called the album "melodious and lyrically rich with seasoned singing" and gave a rating of 3.25 out of 5. At the annual music review roundup published in The Hindu, Karthik listed Premam as the second best Malayalam soundtrack of 2015, after Charlie (composed by Gopi Sunder). Apple Music selected it as the "Best Malayalam album" of 2015. Sanjith Sreedharan of The Times of India listed the album as the "most popular Malayalam music album of 2015". Anu James of International Business Times listed the songs "Malare" and "Aluva Puzha" in the second and third positions in the best Malayalam songs of the year.

Track listing

Chart performance

Other versions 
For the Telugu remake of this film under the same name, Murugesan remade four of his songs into Telugu, with "Evare" (the Telugu remake of the original song "Malare") retained its singer Vijay Yesudas, for the version. The rest of the tracks were sung by different singers, with Naresh Iyer and Karthik contributing vocals to the album, whilst Gopi Sundar composed three new songs for the Telugu counterpart.

Awards

Footnotes

References

External links 

 

2015 soundtrack albums
Malayalam film soundtracks
Romance film soundtracks